is the third studio album of the character Kirari Tsukishima from the Japanese anime Kirarin Revolution.

Background and release

Kirari to Fuyu is the third studio album of the character Kirari Tsukishima from Kirarin Revolution. Aside from containing new original songs, the album compiles songs from her previous single, "Papancake", as well as "Anataboshi" and "Tan Tan Tān!", her songs with Sayaka Kitahara and You Kikkawa from Hello Pro Egg under the name MilkyWay.

The album was released on December 17, 2008 under the Zetima label. The limited edition featured an alternate cover, exclusive DVD, and Happy Idol Life Kuru Kira Cards from Kirarin Revolution. The regular edition came with an original sticker as its first press bonus.

Reception

The album debuted at #26 in the Oricon Weekly Albums Chart and charted for five weeks.

Track listing

Charts

References

2008 albums
Anime soundtracks
Kirarin Revolution
Hello! Project albums
Television soundtracks